Yan England-Girard (born 9 december 1981) is a Canadian actor, television and radio presenter, screenwriter, film producer and director of short films. From the age of eight, he was known for his role of Einstein in the youth program Watatatow during 13 years.

His short film Henry was nominated for an Oscar at the 85th Academy Awards ceremony in the "Best Live Action Short Film" category. 1:54 is his debut long feature film.

Biography 
Born in Mont-Saint-Hilaire, Quebec, Yan England is the son of Michel Girard, economic journalist and Diane England, producer at Zone 3 media group.

Since the age of eight, England has participated in several television series and youth-oriented programs, including Les Débrouillards, Watatatow, Headquarters: Warsaw and Buffy the Vampire Slayer. At the age of eighteen, he moved to Beverly Hills for five years where he studied theatre to get rid of his French accent.

He worked simultaneously in several television series and in August 2013, he became the new morning man at CKOI-FM. On January 10, 2013, one of his films, Henry, was nominated for an Academy Award. The short film of 21 minutes in the "Best Live Action Short Film" category.

Filmography

Cinema 
2000: Life After Love (La vie après l'amour): Bob Miron
2003: I Witness: Jud
2003: July First, the Film (Premier juillet, le film')': Nick
2015: Le Dep: Jérôme
2015: Stonewall: Terry

 Television 
1991: Watatatow: Einstein
1993: Ent'Cadieux: Marc-André
1998: La Part des anges: Karim
1999-2002: Les Débrouillards: Yan
1999: Opération Tango1999: Headquarters: Warsaw: Joshua
2000: Haute Surveillance: Maxime Lamarre
2001: Ayoye!: Kenneth De Grandpré
2002: Buffy the Vampire Slayer: O'Donnell (1 episode)
2003-2006: Ramdam: Antoine Laurin
2004: Naked Josh: Josh
2004: Family Misgivings: Frank
2005: Annie et ses hommes: Max (1 episode)
2005-2011: Providence: Syd
2005: Why George: Zach
2005-2011: Une grenade avec ça?: Darius Léveillé
2006: Getting Along Famously: Randy Ramone
2006: 15/Love: Lucas (2 episodes)
2006-2008: Minuit, le soir: Tom
2007-2008: Les Soeurs Elliot: David Cohen
2008- : Fan club: presenter
2009- : Trauma: Étienne Labrie
2009- : Yamaska : Brian Harrison
2009: Bakugan Battle Brawlers: Baron Letloy (voice)
2010: KARV, l'anti.gala: co-presenter
2010 - 2012: Les Rescapés: Viateur Bolduc
2012: KARV, l'anti.gala: presenter
2013: House of Versace: Michael
2013-2016: : Théophile "Théo" Langevin

 Director 
2007: Moi (also producer and screenwriter)
2011: Henry (also producer and screenwriter)
2016: 1:54 (also screenwriter)
2021: Sam Awards 
2013: Nominated for the Academy Award for Best Live Action Short Film for Henry.
2012: Prix Gémeaux winner for Best Presentation for a Youth series Fan club.
2011: Prix Artis winner for best supporting role in a youth series in Une grenade avec ça?''.

References

External links 

Male actors from Quebec
Film directors from Quebec
Living people
People from Montérégie
1981 births